A joint venture is an entity formed between two or more parties to undertake economic activity together.

Joint venture may also refer to:
 International joint venture, a joint venture with parties in different countries
 Joint Venture (album), an album by the Kottonmouth Kings
 HSV-X1 Joint Venture, a high-speed catamaran operated by the United States Navy and Army between 1998 and 2004
 JointVenture (Apple), a service from Apple that superseded ProCare

See also 
 Common purpose or joint enterprise
 Joint venture broker